Frank Preece Boulton (12 August 1917 – 12 June 1987) was an English footballer who played as a goalkeeper in the Football League for Arsenal, Derby County and Swindon Town.

Boulton started his career at Bath City, joining Arsenal age 19. He joined Derby County in August 1938 and made 39 League appearances either side of World War II. He joined Swindon Town in 1946, where he shared a house with his former Arsenal teammate Albert Young.
As a matter of interest, Frank Boulton's first cousin, Arthur H Jones, was in the first Welsh Rugby side to win at Twickenham in 1933.

References

1917 births
1987 deaths
People from Chipping Sodbury
Sportspeople from Gloucestershire
English footballers
Association football goalkeepers
Bath City F.C. players
Arsenal F.C. players
Derby County F.C. players
Swindon Town F.C. players
Crystal Palace F.C. players
English Football League players